Benjamin Porter may refer to: 

 Benjamin Curtis Porter (1843–1908), American painter
 Benjamin F. Porter (1808–1868), American politician